Sonadih is a village situated on NH-29 in Mau District. The "Thanidas Baba temple" and Shiva temple "Shivalaya" contribute to its glory and make it divine.
The divine pond of Baba Thanidas is also a popular place for self sole purification in nearby regions.
It is believed that people don't lie in the holy temple of Baba Thanidas. 
https://sonadihmabhagwati.com/

This village has also has a very holy temple named Sri Krishna Temple.
This village has its own Facebook account named as "SonadihCharchitChinhitGav".
This village is famous for its water storage ponds. It has so many ponds.
This village has a number of different castes such as Kshtriya, Brahman, Kurmi, Yadav, Badhae, Chamar, Gond, Dhoni, Rawat, Bari, Paswan, Lala, Mushhar, Baniya, Teli, Giri. Muslim is also represented.

People of Village Sonadih have always been living in harmony and peace and they don't hesitate in helping one another. This village has always produced leaders and social workers. Netaji Late Shri Tejpal Singh worked on social awareness and harmony in post independence era. Dr Hriday Narayan Singh is well known surgeon and social worker. Dr Singh is famous for proving medical services to needy people on concessional rate and sometimes for free also. Dr Singh has been elected as member of legislative assembly from Sagri constituency in state legislative elections 2022.

Villages in Mau district